The YoHo Artist Community works out of two of the Alexander Smith Carpet Mills Historic District buildings, located at 540 and 578 Nepperhan Avenue in Yonkers, New York. This population of artists and crafters has grown to more than 80 working artists since 2005.

History of The Alexander Smith and Sons Carpet Company Mills
The buildings were originally developed during the turn of the century and housed the Alexander Smith and Sons Carpet Company, as well as numerous ancillary plants. The entire complex consisted of 38 acres with more than 40 buildings. Thousands of workers filed in each workday, some manufacturing Moquette and tapestry power looms and others using these looms to weave their share of some 50,000 yards of carpet daily.  At the peak of production, the facility was the largest carpet manufacturer in the world. It employed more than 7,000 people and required wool from 15,000 sheep each day.  Alexander Smith and Sons was the largest carpet manufacturer in the world for much of the 83 years the company was in operation in Yonkers. During the Great Depression, it was agreed that employees’ hours would be cut, but jobs were not. The company was constantly increasing its output.

The carpet mill maintained a good reputation and solid success until the end of World War II, when, after a number of employee strikes, the city’s largest employer relocated to Greenville, Mississippi, where workers were not unionized. In the mid-1950s the Yonkers plant shut down entirely, which left the massive complex vacant and an estimated 5,000 workers without jobs. Many of the carpet mills employees had worked for 40 or more years for the company. The stronghold along Nepperhan Avenue and the Saw Mill River, and within the Yonkers community, was suddenly empty.

Beginning of the YoHo Artist Community
With the deindustrialization of cities like Yonkers came the abandonment and deterioration of these massive buildings as communities developed an alternative economic purpose for their vacant properties. In this case, most of the 40-building complex stood empty for nearly 20 years until developers and smaller manufacturers began to secure them for various uses.  The two loft buildings that house the YoHo community were purchased in 1978 by Mr. Allan Eisenkraft of Yonkers Industrial Development Corporation, who spent a total of about $4.5 million in conversion renovations.  The buildings were then rented out to small businesses, mainly for manufacturing or creative industrial uses. The lower floors still operate in this manner today.

In 1983, the loft buildings were listed on the National Register of Historic Places by the United States Department of the Interior. 

In 1986, when looking for artist loft space at the height of the real estate market boom, Debra Sherwood, a sculptor relocating from Seattle to the New York City area explored different options for artist work space.  Industrial building floors for rent were advertised by Yonkers Industrial Development Corporation.  After contacting the realtor to obtain rental information about the building, Ms. Sherwood agreed to lease the fifth floor of the building.  She used the space for her studio and sublet other portions of the space to fellow artists.  She named the space YoHo Studios, for "Yonkers above Houston".  YoHo studios had four lively open studio events before 1991.  At the time, artists and Westchester artist studios were a rarity in the area, and YoHo was featured in several Westchester County journals as well as two articles in the New York Times.

As artists sought larger spaces that they could afford, they were attracted to areas like Yonkers, which are within commuting distance to the traditional arts centers in SoHo and Chelsea, Manhattan.  In the early 1990s, more and more artists and crafters began to occupy the Westchester artist studios located within the former Alexander Smith and Sons Carpet Company Mills.

YoHo’s members and their work
Among the artists that rent or have rented space at YoHo include producers of murals, collages, sculptures, mixed media, and portraits.  While the population is made up of primarily visual artists and specifically painters, there has also been a sculptor utilizing expired medical products, a tattoo artist, and a former member of the Orange County Choppers, a creator of custom motorcycle graphics.

During scheduled “Open Studio” events, members allow the community access to their private studios to view the creative process and environments in which the artists work. The Great Hall on the fifth floor is a gallery-like space where artwork is displayed, and members gather.  Common areas like this one, as well as the private studios, utilize the buildings 14–16-foot ceilings and factory-style windows.

The community has earned recognition by New York State Senator Andrea Stewart-Cousins, who deemed April 18, 2009, “YoHo Artist Studios Day”.  The mayor of the city of Yonkers, Phil Amicone, issued a proclamation recognizing YoHo’s role in the growing artist community by dedicating a day to the community as well.

The YoHo community has expanded since the property’s most recent acquisition in 2005.  In the beginning of 2011 the owners began the creation of 25 new spaces that would occupy a fourth floor wing, and by early 2014, all spaces were occupied by a diverse group of working artists. Combined with the original 50+ studios that were already occupied at 540 and 578 Nepperhan Avenue, this site has become known as Southern Westchester’s largest artist community.

In early 2014, the owners and developers of YoHo began collaborating with proprietors of neighboring buildings within and surrounding the historic carpet mills to create Yonkers' first official arts district.  The rallying of this group influenced the city's planning and development officials to begin the process of adjusting current zoning to incorporate and allow for the further establishment of this arts district. The zoning was expected to be finalized by the second quarter of 2015. The proposed zoning change would also allow for retail shops to operate at street level, with the intention of servicing the arts community and those attending the community's regularly scheduled events.

References

American artist groups and collectives
Artists' studios in the United States
Yonkers, New York